Zarand County is in Kerman province, Iran. The capital of the county is the city of Zarand. At the 2006 census, the county's population was 119,144 in 28,746 households.The following census in 2011 counted 129,104 people in 35,388 households, by which time Shaab Jereh Rural District had been separated from Kuhbanan County to join Zarand County.  At the 2016 census, the county's population was 138,133 in 39,451 households.

Administrative divisions

The population history and structural changes of Zarand County's administrative divisions over three consecutive censuses are shown in the following table. The latest census shows two districts, 11 rural districts, and four cities.

References

 

Counties of Kerman Province